Mglinsky District is an administrative and municipal district (raion), one of the twenty-seven in Bryansk Oblast, Russia. It is located in the west of the oblast. Its administrative center is the town of Mglin. Population:   22,551 (2002 Census);  The population of Mglin accounts for 43.4% of the district's total population.

References

Notes

Sources

Districts of Bryansk Oblast